The blue-and-white swallow (Pygochelidon cyanoleuca) is a passerine bird that breeds from Nicaragua south throughout South America, except in the deserts and the Amazon Basin. The southern race is migratory, wintering as far north as Trinidad, where it is a regular visitor. The nominate northern race may have bred on that island.

Taxonomy
The blue-and-white swallow was first formally described as Hirundo cyanoleuca by the French ornithologist Louis Vieillot in 1817, based on a specimen he believed to be from Paraguay. The scientific name has the same meaning as the English common name.

This species was formerly placed in the genus Notiochelidon. It was moved to the resurrected genus Pygochelidon based on a phylogenetic study published in 2005.

Three subspecies are recognised:
 P. c. cyanoleuca (Vieillot, 1817) – Costa Rica through northern, central South America
 P. c. peruviana Chapman, 1922 – western Peru
 P. c. patagonica (d'Orbigny & Lafresnaye, 1837) – southern South America

Description
It has dark blue upperparts and white underparts, and its underwings and the undersurface of its short forked tail are blackish. The juvenile is brown above, buff-tinted below, and has a less forked tail. The call is a buzzing dzzzhreeee.

There are three subspecies. The nominate N. c. cyanoleuca occurs from Nicaragua and Trinidad south to northwestern Argentina, Paraguay and Uruguay. The migratory southern race N. c. patagonica is larger, has paler underwings, and white basal undertail coverts. N. c. peruviana is restricted to coastal Peru up to  altitude. It is smaller than patagonica, has less white in the undertail, darker underwings and duskier flanks.

Distribution and habitat
This is a swallow of open areas including villages and towns, farms, and forest clearings.

Behaviour and ecology
This species is often found in small flocks when not breeding. The blue-and-white swallow subsists primarily on a diet of insects, caught in the air; they have been seen to gather where termites swarm. The flight is typically fluttery, and this swallow frequently perches on wires or branches.

Breeding
The blue-and-white swallow's shallow straw nest is built by both adults in a wide range of natural or man-made cavities include tree holes, rock crevices and bridges. The clutch is up to six white eggs in the south of the range, two or three in the north, which are incubated by both parents for 15 days to hatching. The nestlings are fed by both parents for 26 days to fledging, but return to the nest to sleep with the parents for up to two months. There may be two broods.

Status
This common and popular species has benefited greatly from deforestation and human settlement which have increased the amount of suitable habitat and food. Consequently, it is not considered threatened by the IUCN.

References

Further reading

External links

 
 
 
 

blue-and-white swallow
Birds of Nicaragua
Birds of Panama
Birds of South America
Birds of Trinidad and Tobago
blue-and-white swallow
blue-and-white swallow
Birds of Brazil